Maiyas Beverages and Foods (or Maiyas) is an Indian packaged food company operating chiefly in Bangalore.

History
The company was started by Parampalli Sadananda Maiya in 2012. Sadananda Maiya's father Parampalli Yagnanarayana Maiya started Mavalli Tiffin Room (MTR) in 1924. Sadananda Maiya started MTR Foods in 1976, the packaged foods division of MTR, his second entrepreneurial venture.

Company
Peepul Capital and Ascent Capital each hold 30 percent stake each in the company, while the Maiya family holds the remaining 40.

Maiyas Restaurant at Jayanagar 
Some of the available dishes are masala dosa, benne dosa, kesari bat, idli, vada, bisi bele bath, mosaru vade, and sambar vada.

References

External links
Official website

Companies based in Bangalore
Indian brands
Condiment companies
Food and drink companies of India
Food and drink companies established in 2012
Indian companies established in 2012